Syntypistis defector is a species of moth of the family Notodontidae first described by Alexander Schintlmeister in 1997. It is found in China (Yunnan) and Vietnam.

References

Moths described in 1997
Notodontidae